The Tarkhan Dress, named for the Tarkhan cemetery south of Cairo in Egypt where it was excavated in 1913, is an over 5000 year old linen garment that was confirmed as the world's oldest piece of women's clothing.

The dress coded UC28614B is currently in the collection of the University College London (UCL) Petrie Museum of Egyptian Archaeology. Radiocarbon testing in 1978 dated the item to around 2362 BCE, though a further test in 2015 by the University of Oxford affirms, with 95% accuracy, that the dress dates from between 3482 and 3102 BCE.

Discovery
The dress was discovered in 1913 during the second season of Sir Flinders Petrie excavations of the Tarkhan necropolis. During the excavation of Mastaba 2050, the dress alongside other linen outside of the Mastaba, believed to have been thrown out later in antiquity and sanded over, preserving the artefacts. The linen was sent to the University College London for analysis, where it lay untouched for sixty five years.

The dress was rediscovered in 1977 by conservationists at the Victoria and Albert Museum who were sorting through and cleaning 'funerary rags'.

Dress
The dress has a weave of 22–23 warps per centimetre, and 13–14 wefts per centimetre creating a grey stripe in the warp, possibly for a decorative effect. The main body of the dress was 76 centimetre wide straight piece of material. The hem of the dress is missing, leaving the original length unknown.

See also
 List of individual dresses

References

Bibliography

Further reading

Archaeology of Egypt
Archaeological artifacts
History of clothing
Individual dresses